Leslie Meredith Tsou is an American diplomat who is the US Ambassador to Oman. Tsou arrived in Oman on January 10, 2020.

Immediately prior to this assignment, Tsou served as the first Deputy Chief of Mission of the U.S. Embassy in Jerusalem following its opening in May 2018.  Before that, she served as the Deputy Chief of Mission at the U.S. Embassy in Tel Aviv from 2016 to 2017.

Tsou earned a B.S. in Foreign Service from Georgetown University.

Tenure 
On April 18, 2022, Oman and the United States signed an agreement on the employment of official employees’ spouses. Tsou and Omani diplomat Mohammed Nasser Al Wahaibi, were responsible in signing this agreement.

Personal life
Tsou speaks Arabic and Polish.

See also
List of current ambassadors of the United States
List of ambassadors appointed by Donald Trump

References

Living people
American women ambassadors
Walsh School of Foreign Service alumni
Ambassadors of the United States to Oman
Year of birth missing (living people)
21st-century American women
American women diplomats